KCVY (89.9 FM) is a radio station licensed to Cabool, Missouri, United States.  The station is an affiliate of Spirit FM, broadcasting a Christian Contemporary Music format with a few Christian talk and teaching programs, and is currently owned by Lake Area Educational Broadcasting Foundation.

History
The station was assigned the call letters KVBD on October 17, 2000. On May 17, 2001, the station changed its call sign to KFFW, on August 7, 2008 to the current KCVY, and on August 3, 2006, the station was sold to Lake Area Educational Broadcasting Foundation.

References

External links
 

CVY